Luis René Rodas Medina (born 3 January 1985) is a Honduran football striker who plays for Mictlán.

Club career
Nicknamed el Castor (the Beaver), he previously played for F.C. Motagua since he was 10 years old.

After Rodas and teammate Roy Posas were released by Motagua after a drink-driving incident which led to their arrest, Rodas moved abroad to play for Guatemalan side Suchitepéquez where he was joined by compatriot José Güity in 2009. He joined Necaxa for the 2010 Apertura championship and returned to Guatemala to play the 2012 Clausura for Mictlán.

International career
Rodas has played in every category of the Honduras national football team, making his debut for the senior side versus El Salvador. He also played at the 2008 Summer Olympics.

Honours and awards

Club
F.C. Motagua
Copa Interclubes UNCAF (1): 2007

References

External links
 Luis Rodas: Hay casos de homosexualismo y drogas, a mi me castigaron por defenderme (Interview) – La Tribuna 

1985 births
Living people
Sportspeople from Tegucigalpa
Association football forwards
Honduran footballers
Honduras international footballers
Footballers at the 2008 Summer Olympics
Olympic footballers of Honduras
Hispano players
F.C. Motagua players
C.D. Suchitepéquez players
Honduran expatriate footballers
Expatriate footballers in Guatemala
Liga Nacional de Fútbol Profesional de Honduras players